The Red Barn is a historic barn located on the Brighton Seminole Indian Reservation in Glades County, Florida. It was built in 1941 with help from the Civilian Conservation Corps to serve the Seminole cattle business. It has a dirt floor and rests on a concrete block foundation. Its roof was replaced with a metal one after Hurricane Wilma in 2005. On December 24, 2008, it was added to the National Register of Historic Places.

References

Civilian Conservation Corps in Florida
Seminole Tribe of Florida
Barns on the National Register of Historic Places in Florida
National Register of Historic Places in Glades County, Florida
1941 establishments in Florida
Buildings and structures completed in 1941